Dr. Sándor Gombos (December 4, 1895 – January 27, 1968, in Zombor, Kingdom of Hungary) was a Hungarian Olympic champion sabre fencer.

Early and personal life
Gombos was born in Zombor, Kingdom of Hungary, and was Jewish.

Fencing career
Gombos was a member of the Nemzeti Vivo Club (NVC), as well as of the Istvan Tisza Fencing Club which he founded in 1925.

Hungarian Championship

Gombos was the Hungarian sabre champion in 1930.

European Championships
At the European Championships (predecessor to the World Championships), Gombos won gold medals in Individual Sabre at the 1926, 1927, 1930, and 1931 events and gold medals in Team Sabre at the 1930 and 1931 events.

Olympics
He won a gold medal in Team Sabre at the 1928 Summer Olympics in Amsterdam, in which the Hungarian team went undefeated. He finished in fifth place in Individual Sabre, winning 8 of his 11 matches.

Miscellaneous
Gombos fought a duel in 1937 with a fencing instructor, which was reported in the Hungarian press.

Hall of Fame
Gombos, who was Jewish, was inducted into the International Jewish Sports Hall of Fame in 1997.

See also
List of select Jewish fencers

References

External links
Jewish Sports bio
Jewish Sports Legends bio
Jewish History and the Ideology of Modern Sport:  Approaches and Interpretations"

1895 births
1968 deaths
Sportspeople from Sombor
Hungarian male sabre fencers
Jewish male sabre fencers
Jewish Hungarian sportspeople
Olympic fencers of Hungary
Fencers at the 1928 Summer Olympics
Olympic gold medalists for Hungary
Olympic medalists in fencing
International Jewish Sports Hall of Fame inductees
Medalists at the 1928 Summer Olympics